The 1978 New Zealand general election was a nationwide vote to elect the 39th New Zealand Parliament. It saw the governing National Party, led by Robert Muldoon, retain office, but the opposition Labour Party won the largest share of the vote. Reorganisation of the enrolment system caused major problems with the electoral rolls, which left a legacy of unreliable information about voting levels in this election.

Background
The National Party had won a resounding victory in the 1975 elections, taking fifty-five of the eighty-seven seats and ousting the Labour Party from government. Labour had been led by Bill Rowling, who had assumed the post of Prime Minister on the death in office of the popular Norman Kirk. Labour won the remaining thirty-two seats in that election, with no other parties gaining entry to Parliament.

Labour's Rowling had been criticised by many for inadequately countering Muldoon's confrontational style, and was widely perceived as "weak". Following Labour's defeat, there had been speculation about replacing Rowling as leader of the party, but Rowling retained his position. Gradually, as some people wearied of Muldoon's style, Rowling's more reserved manner was held up as an asset rather than a weakness, and Labour began to gain a certain amount of traction again. Economic troubles hurt the government, and its reputation had fallen. Muldoon remained a powerful opponent, however, and was regarded as a strong campaigner.

Not long before the 1978 election, a by-election in Rangitikei caused considerable comment when it introduced a third party to Parliament: Bruce Beetham, leader of the Social Credit Party. Although other parties dismissed Social Credit's success as a fluke, Beetham predicted a great future for the party.

MPs retiring in 1978
Five National MPs and three Labour MPs intended to retire at the end of the 38th Parliament.

Sir Stanley Whitehead MP for Nelson had announced he would retire at the end of the term in 1978, due to ill-health, but he died on 9 January 1976 triggering a by-election instead.

Electoral changes

Problems
In 1975 several reforms had been made to the electoral system. These included combining the re-enrolment process with the taking of the 1976 census and replacing existing Justice Department registrars with electorate officers appointed from Post Office Staff. They would work in conjunction with Statistics Department and Electoral Office staff, and at the same time, a switch would be made from a manual to a computerised system.

A report completed in 1979 found that there had been poor liaison between the various departments involved, staff shortages and problems with the computer system. However, the main problem arose from the decision to combine re-enrolment with the 1976 census. Many voters had been confused by the need to re-enrol only a year after the previous election, and many had not bothered to fill out their forms. Census staff had not been given the authority to insist on the card being completed.

To avoid disenfranchising a significant portion of the electorate, the Chief Electoral Officer decided just to carry forward many old voter registrations in the hope that duplications and outdated enrolments would be purged later. However, not enough staff were provided to complete that in time, and by the time that the rolls closed, 35,000 forms remained unprocessed.

It has been estimated that as many as 460,000 enrolments may have been outdated or duplicates. Many voters (even candidates) found themselves enrolled in the wrong electorate or off the roll completely, and others were enrolled in multiple electorates or several times in the same electorate. That means that accurate figures for electoral turnout are impossible to determine, and other figures may not be reliable.

Electoral redistribution
The 1977 electoral redistribution was the most overtly political since the Representation Commission had been established by an amendment to the Representation Act in 1886, initiated by Muldoon's National Government. That a large number of people failed to fill out an electoral re-registration card had little practical effect for the electoral redistribution for people on the general roll, but it transferred Māori to the general roll if the card was not handed in. Together with a northward shift of New Zealand's population, that resulted in five new electorates having to be created in the upper part of the North Island.

The electoral redistribution was very disruptive, and 22 electorates were abolished (see list below), and 27 electorates were newly created or re-established. In the North Island, fifteen electorates were newly created (and ) and six electorates were re-created (and ). In the South Island, two electorates were newly created ( and ) and four electorates were re-created (and ). The changes came into effect for the 1978 election.

The election
The election was held on 25 November. There were 2,489,510 people officially registered to vote in the elections, making the election the first one in which there were more than two million registered voters. However, the electoral roll in 1978 was significantly out of date and contained numerous duplicate entries. The cause of this confusion was a major redistribution of electoral boundaries, which had been implemented the year before. The actual number of potential voters is estimated to have been about 2,100,000, and actual turnout is estimated to have been about 80% (as compared to the official turnout of only 68.70%), slightly lower than the turnout for the previous election.

Summary of results
The 1978 election saw the National Party win fifty-one seats in parliament, a majority of several seats. This allowed it to retain power. The Labour Party won forty seats. The Social Credit Party retained the Rangitikei seat, which it had won in a by-election shortly before the election. No other parties won seats, and there were no successful independent candidates.

While National won a majority of seats in parliament, it did not actually win a majority of the vote. Labour received the highest number of votes, winning slightly more than forty percent. National, by contrast, won slightly less than forty percent. Social Credit, despite winning only one seat, actually received around sixteen percent of the vote. The election night result had National with more seats, but many seats had small majorities and it was conceivable that if special votes overturned enough electorates Labour could form a government. Ultimately this did not eventuate however.

While the  electorate was initially won by Malcolm Douglas  (Labour), the result was overturned by the High Court and Winston Peters (National) became the MP for Hunua.

Detailed results

Party Totals

Votes summary

Results by electorate
The tables below shows the results of the 1978 general election:

Key

|-
 |colspan=8 style="background-color:#FFDEAD" | General electorates
|-

|-
 | Hauraki
 | colspan=2 style="text-align:center; background-color:#ececec;" | New electorate
 | style="background-color:;" |
 | style="text-align:center;background-color:;" | Leo Schultz
 | style="text-align:right;" | 2,019
 | style="background-color:;" |
 | style="text-align:center;" | Gordon Miller
|-

|-
 |colspan=8 style="background-color:#FFDEAD" | Māori electorates
|-

|}
Table footnotes:

Map

Summary of changes
For details about the winners of each individual electorate, see the article on the 39th Parliament.

Electoral redistributions:
A major reconfiguration of electorates and their boundaries occurred in 1977. This resulted in twenty-two electorates being dissolved and twenty-seven new electorates being formed (a net gain of five electorates).
The seats of Bay of Plenty, Coromandel, Egmont, Franklin, Grey Lynn, Henderson, Hobson, Hutt, Karori, Manukau, Oamaru, Petone, Piako, Raglan, Rakaia, Riccarton, Rodney, Ruahine, South Canterbury, Stratford, Waitemata, and Wigram ceased to exist.
The seats of Albany, Ashburton, Bay of Islands, East Cape, Eastern Hutt, Fendalton, Hauraki, Helensville, Horowhenua, Hunua, Kaimai, Kaipara, Matamata, Ohariu, Papakura, Papatoetoe, Pencarrow, Rangiriri, Selwyn, Taranaki, Tarawera, Te Atatu, Waipa, Waitakere, Waitaki, Waitotara, and Yaldhurst came into being.
Seats captured:
By Labour: Hastings, Lyttelton, Manurewa, Palmerston North, Papanui, Taupo, and Western Hutt were captured from National.
By National: None
By Social Credit: None
Seats transferred from departing MPs to new MPs:
The seats of Clutha, Manawatu, Marlborough, Pakuranga, and Rotorua, all held by departing National MPs, were won by new National candidates.
The seats of Dunedin North, Island Bay, St Albans, and West Coast, all held by departing Labour MPs, were won by new Labour candidates.

Notes

References

 
November 1978 events in New Zealand